The 2012 Baltimore Sports Car Challenge presented by SRT was a multi-class sports car and GT motor race held on the streets of Baltimore in Maryland, United States on September 1, 2012. It was the eighth round of the 2012 American Le Mans Series season and the second race Baltimore Sports Car Challenge, and event co-located with the Grand Prix of Baltimore IndyCar race. The race was held over a two-hour time period, during which 67 laps of the 3.3 kilometre circuit were completed for a race distance of 218 kilometres.

The race was won by Level 5 Motorsports duo of Scott Tucker and Christophe Bouchut driving a HPD ARX-03b. The race was dominated by the P2 class cars as trouble struck all three P1 class prototypes. When Conquest Endurance broke a gearbox in their Morgan LMP2 it set up the first outright victory by a P2 prototype since Andretti Green Racing's Franck Montagny and James Rossiter took victory at the 2008 Detroit Sports Car Challenge, also driving a HPD ARX. Second place was also a Level 5 Motorsports HPD ARX-03b, driven by Tucker, Luis Díaz and Ricardo González.

Third was the first of the Prototype Challenge Oreca FLM09s, the CORE Autosport car of Alex Popow and Ryan Dalziel.

Even more notable the Level 5 Motorsports' 1–2 victory, the Team Falken Tire Porsche of Wolf Henzler and Bryan Sellers finished fourth, winning the GT class, finishing on the same lap as the Level 5 HPDs. They finished ahead of the factory Chevrolet Corvette of Oliver Gavin and Tommy Milner, the Extreme Speed Motorsports Ferrari of Scott Sharp and Johannes van Overbeek, the BMW Team RLL BMW of Joey Hand and Dirk Müller, the Flying Lizard Motorsports Porsche of Jörg Bergmeister and Patrick Long and the second Corvette of Jan Magnussen and Antonio García as GTs dominated the top ten finishers.

Thirteenth was the P1 class survivor, the Dyson Racing Team Lola B11/66 of Michael Marsal and Eric Lux.

GT Challenge was claimed when the TRG Porsche of Patrick Pilet and debutant Al Carter crossed the line in 19th position.

24 of the 30 entries were running at races conclusion.

Race

Race result
Class winners in bold.  Cars failing to complete 70% of their class winner's distance are marked as Not Classified (NC).

References

Baltimore
Baltimore Grand Prix
Baltimore Sports Car Challenge
2010s in Baltimore